New York School may refer to:

 New York School (art), a group of poets and artists of the 1960s
 New York school of photography, an approach to photographing NYC in the mid-20th century
 New York School, a term coined by Ann Mische in the field of 1990s relational sociology

See also
 New York University
 Education in New York